Víctor Segura Abascal (born 30 March 1973) is a Spanish retired footballer who played as a central defender.

Football career
A product of Real Zaragoza's youth ranks, Zaragoza-born Segura made his senior debut in the 1990–91 season with its B-team, in the third division. Released by the Aragonese without making any competitive appearances, his first club as a professional was Palamós CF in the second level.

After a solid 1993–94, Segura was signed by La Liga's CD Logroñés, appearing regularly but facing relegation in 1995 in what was his sole top flight campaign – the Riojan side ranked last with an all-time low 13 points. He then had two unassuming seasons with UE Lleida, also in Catalonia and division two.

Segura moved to England in 1997 with Norwich City, signed by manager Mike Walker on a Bosman transfer. His spell with the club was not a successful one, and he was released by Walker's successor Bruce Rioch two years later, having spent his final year majorly with the reserves.

Segura retired at the end of 1999–2000, after just eight second tier matches with Getafe CF. He was only 27.

References

Canary Citizens by Mark Davage, John Eastwood, Kevin Platt, published by Jarrold Publishing, (2001),

External links

Norwich City archives

1973 births
Living people
Footballers from Zaragoza
Spanish footballers
Association football defenders
La Liga players
Segunda División players
Segunda División B players
Real Zaragoza B players
Palamós CF footballers
CD Logroñés footballers
UE Lleida players
Getafe CF footballers
English Football League players
Norwich City F.C. players
Spanish expatriate footballers
Expatriate footballers in England
Spanish expatriate sportspeople in England